The Assembly of the Six Counties was an assembly of Patriote leaders and approximately 6,000 followers held in Saint-Charles, Lower Canada (present-day Quebec) on October 23 and October 24, 1837, despite the June 15 Proclamation of the government forbidding public assemblies.

Presided by Wolfred Nelson, it is the most famous of the various public assemblies held during that year protesting the Russell Resolutions. It is a prelude to the Lower Canada Rebellion of 1837. The "six counties" refer to Richelieu, Rouville, Saint-Hyacinthe, Chambly, Verchères and L'Acadie.

History 
The Ninety-Two Resolutions of the Patriotes had demanded from Great Britain democratic reforms for Lower Canada. They had been mostly denied by the Russell Resolutions, which sparked a number of assemblies of protest in 1837. The Saint-Charles assembly was attended by 13 members of the Legislative Assembly of Lower Canada. On the field, a column, the Colonne de la liberté, had been raised with the inscription "À Papineau ses compatriotes reconnaissants" ("To Papineau his thankful compatriots"). A replica, inaugurated in 1982, stands today on the site.

It saw the speeches of the likes of Louis-Joseph Papineau and Wolfred Nelson. Papineau advocated the pursuit of the constitutional struggle through economic boycotts of British products while Nelson and Doctor Cyrille Côté supported an armed uprising. "I claim the time has come to melt our spoons to make bullets", thundered Nelson. Étienne Parent also spoke and supported non-forceful methods. The assembly voted a number of resolutions, as did the other 1837 assemblies. They notably proclaimed human rights, refused to recognize the new Executive Council of Lower Canada and approved the Société des fils de la liberté. They did not mention the use of force.

This event prompted the negative reaction of the Lower Canada Church. At a banquet in honour of Bishop Ignace Bourget (himself one of the relatively rare clerics in favour of the Patriotes), Bishop Jean-Jacques Lartigue declared: "Never is it permitted to transgress laws of to revolt against the legitimate authority under which people have the joy of living". Three weeks after the assembly, an arrest warrant for Patriote leaders was issued by the government.

Notes

References 
  Christian Desjardins. "23 et 24 octobre 1837 - L'Assemblée des Six-Comtés à Saint-Charles", in Les Patriotes de 1837@1838, March 10, 2000
  Jean-Paul Bernard. Assemblées publiques, résolutions et déclarations de 1837-1838, Montréal: VLB Éditeur, 1988, 304 p.

See also 
Patriote popular assemblies
Patriote movement
Quebec nationalism
Quebec independence movement
History of Quebec

Political history of Quebec
Lower Canada Rebellion
Patriote movement
Quebec art
1837 in Lower Canada
1837 conferences